Kamenný Most is a municipality and village in Kladno District in the Central Bohemian Region of the Czech Republic. It has about 400 inhabitants.

History
The first written mention of Kamenný Most is from 1088, when it was owned by the Vyšehrad Chapter.

Sights

References

Villages in Kladno District